Alois Alzheimer (14 June 1864 – 19 December 1915) was a German psychiatrist and neuropathologist and a colleague of Emil Kraepelin. Alzheimer is credited with identifying the first published case of "presenile dementia", which Kraepelin would later identify as Alzheimer's disease.

Early life and education
Alzheimer was born in Marktbreit, Bavaria, on 14 June 1864, the son of Anna Johanna Barbara Sabina and Eduard Román Alzheimer. His father served in the office of notary public in the family's hometown.

The Alzheimers moved to Aschaffenburg when Alois was still young in order to give their children an opportunity to attend the Royal Humanistic Gymnasium. After graduating with Abitur in 1883, Alzheimer studied medicine at University of Berlin, University of Tübingen, and University of Würzburg. In his final year at university, he was a member of a fencing fraternity, and even received a fine for disturbing the peace while out with his team. In 1887, Alois Alzheimer graduated from Würzburg as Doctor of Medicine.

Career
The following year, he spent five months assisting mentally ill women before he took an office in the city mental asylum in Frankfurt, the Städtische Anstalt für Irre und Epileptische (Asylum for Lunatics and Epileptics). , a noted psychiatrist, was the dean of the asylum. Another neurologist, Franz Nissl, began to work in the same asylum with Alzheimer. Together, they conducted research on the pathology of the nervous system, specifically the normal and pathological anatomy of the cerebral cortex. Alzheimer was the co-founder and co-publisher of the journal Zeitschrift für die gesamte Neurologie und Psychiatrie, though he never wrote a book that he could call his own.

While at the Frankfurt asylum, Alzheimer also met Emil Kraepelin, one of the best-known German psychiatrists of the time. Kraepelin became a mentor to Alzheimer, and the two worked very closely for the next several years. When Kraepelin moved to Munich to work at the Royal Psychiatric Hospital in 1903, he invited Alzheimer to join him.

At the time, Kraepelin was doing clinical research on psychosis in senile patients; Alzheimer, on the other hand, was more interested in the lab work of senile illnesses. The two men would face many challenges involving the politics of the psychiatric community. For example, both formal and informal arrangements would be made among psychiatrists at asylums and universities to receive cadavers.

In 1904, Alzheimer completed his habilitation at Ludwig Maximilian University of Munich, where he was appointed as a professor in 1908. Afterwards, he left Munich for the Silesian Friedrich Wilhelm University in Breslau in 1912, where he accepted a post as professor of psychiatry and director of the Neurologic and Psychiatric Institute. His health deteriorated shortly after his arrival so that he was hospitalized. Alzheimer died three years later.

Auguste Deter
In 1901, Alzheimer observed a patient at the Frankfurt asylum named Auguste Deter. The 51-year-old patient had strange behavioral symptoms, including a loss of short-term memory; she became his obsession over the coming years. Auguste Deter was a victim of the politics of the time in the psychiatric community; the Frankfurt asylum was too expensive for her husband. Herr Deter made several requests to have his wife moved to a less expensive facility, but Alzheimer intervened in these requests. Frau Deter, as she was known, remained at the Frankfurt asylum, where Alzheimer had made a deal to receive her records and brain upon her death.

On 8 April 1906, Frau Deter died, and Alzheimer had her medical records and brain brought to Munich where he was working in Kraepelin's laboratory. With two Italian physicians, he used the newly developed Bielschowsky stain to identify amyloid plaques and neurofibrillary tangles. These brain anomalies would become identifiers of what later became known as Alzheimer's disease.

Findings
Alzheimer discussed his findings on the brain pathology and symptoms of presenile dementia publicly on 3November 1906, at the Tübingen meeting of the Southwest German Psychiatrists. The attendees at this lecture seemed uninterested in what he had to say. The lecturer that followed Alzheimer was to speak on the topic of "compulsive masturbation", which the audience of 88 individuals was so eagerly awaiting that they sent Alzheimer away without any questions or comments on his discovery of the pathology of a type of senile dementia.

Following the lecture, Alzheimer published a short paper summarizing his lecture; in 1907 he wrote a longer paper detailing the disease and his findings. The disease would not become known as Alzheimer's disease until 1910, when Kraepelin named it so in the chapter on "Presenile and Senile Dementia" in the 8th edition of his Handbook of Psychiatry. By 1911, his description of the disease was being used by European physicians to diagnose patients in the US.

Contemporaries 
American Solomon Carter Fuller gave a report similar to that of Alzheimer at a lecture five months before Alzheimer. Oskar Fischer was a fellow German psychiatrist, 12 years Alzheimer's junior, who reported 12 cases of senile dementia in 1907 around the time that Alzheimer published his short paper summarizing his lecture.

Alzheimer and Fischer had different interpretations of the disease, but due to Alzheimer's short life, they never had the opportunity to meet and discuss their ideas.

Among the doctors trained by Alois Alzheimer and Emil Kraepelin at Munich in the beginning of the 20th century were the Spanish neuropathologists Nicolás Achúcarro and Gonzalo Rodríguez Lafora, two distinguished disciples of Santiago Ramón y Cajal and members of the Spanish Neurological School. Alzheimer recommended the young and brilliant Nicolás Achúcarro to organize the neuropathological service at the Government Hospital for the Insane, at Washington D.C. (current, NIH), and after two years of work, he was substituted by Gonzalo Rodríguez Lafora.

Other interests
Alzheimer was known for having a variety of medical interests including vascular diseases of the brain, early dementia, brain tumors, forensic psychiatry and epilepsy. Alzheimer was a leading specialist in histopathology in Europe. His colleagues knew him to be a dedicated professor and cigar smoker.

Personal life and death

In 1894, Alzheimer married Cecilie Simonette Nathalie Geisenheimer, with whom he had three children. Geisenheimer died in 1901.

In August 1912, Alzheimer fell ill on the train on his way to the University of Breslau, where he had been appointed professor of psychiatry in July 1912. Most probably he had a streptococcal infection and subsequent rheumatic fever leading to valvular heart disease, heart failure and kidney failure. He did not recover completely from this illness.

He died of heart failure on 19 December 1915 at age 51, in Breslau, Silesia (present-day Wrocław, Poland). He was buried on 23 December 1915 next to his wife at the Frankfurt Main Cemetery.

Critics and rediscovery
In the early 1990s, critics began to question Alzheimer's findings and form their own hypotheses based on Alzheimer's notes and papers. Amaducci and colleagues hypothesized that Auguste Deter had metachromatic leukodystrophy, a rare condition in which accumulations of fats affect the cells that produce myelin. Claire O'Brien, meanwhile, hypothesized that Auguste Deter actually had a vascular dementing disease.

See also
 Gaetano Perusini
 German inventors and discoverers

References

External links 

 Alzheimer's: 100 years on
 Alois Alzheimer's Biography, International Brain Research Organization
 Bibliography of secondary sources on Alois Alzheimer and Alzheimer's disease, selected from peer-reviewed journals.
 Graeber Manuel B. "Alois Alzheimer (1864–1915)" International Brain Research Organization

1864 births
1915 deaths
People from Marktbreit
People from the Kingdom of Bavaria
German neuroscientists
Alzheimer's disease
German psychiatrists
Burials at Frankfurt Main Cemetery
Academic staff of the Ludwig Maximilian University of Munich
Academic staff of the University of Breslau
Humboldt University of Berlin alumni
University of Tübingen alumni
University of Würzburg alumni